The Tartan oil field is a significant crude oil producing field in the UK sector of the North Sea, 187 km north-east of Aberdeen. Production of oil started in 1981 and ceased in 2020, the Tartan Alpha installation is currently (2021) undergoing decommissioning.

The field 
The Tartan oil field is located in Blocks 15/16a and 14/20a of the UK North Sea continental shelf. Its name continues the Scottish theme of oil fields in the area (eg Claymore, Piper, Scott). The Tartan field was discovered in February  1975 and the oil reservoir comprises an Upper Jurassic sandstone at a depth of 9,800 to 12,000 feet (2,9873 to 3,658 metres). The reservoir and its fluids had the following characteristics:

Owners and operators 
The initial owner of the field was Texaco North Sea Limited which also operated the field. Talisman assumed ownership in 2000. The company became Talisman Sinopec Energy, then Repsol Sinopec.

Development 
The field was developed by a single integrated drilling, production and accommodation platform: Tartan Alpha (Tartan A). The principal design data of the Tartan A platform is given in the following table.

Tartan Alpha was originally connected to the Piper Alpha platform through a 19 km 18-inch diameter gas pipeline. The failure of the riser of this pipeline at about 22:20 6 July 1988 during the Piper Alpha disaster led to a second major explosion followed by a widespread fire.

Production from Tartan's faulted reservoir was 'disappointing'. Texaco therefore halted production well drilling on Tartan and focussed on the Highlander field, about 13 km north-west of Tartan, to enable the field to produce through Tartan.

Tartan satellites 
In addition to its own production several other smaller fields were tied back to Tartan. The design data is summarized below.

Production from the Galley field was originally through the Northern Producer a floating production facility.

Processing 
Oil from the wellheads and subsea tie-ins was routed to one of five 1st stage 3-phase (oil, gas, water) separators. Oil flowed from the 1st stage separators to the single 2nd stage separator and from there was pumped through metering streams to the 27 km 24-inch diameter oil export pipeline to Claymore.

Produced water from the separators was treated in a degassing vessel and hydrocyclones to an oil-in-water concentration of less than 30 mg/litre prior to discharge overboard.

Gas from the separators was compressed in the single 5 stage compression train. Gas was treated to remove hydrogen sulfide. Some gas was used to provide lift gas for the wells and the remainder was exported via a 72 km 18-inch pipeline to the Frigg MCP01 bypass line, and thence to St. Fergus.

By 2017 there were 5 Tartan production wells and 1 subsea injection well.

The fluid handling capability of the Tartan facilities in its latter years of operation was as follows:

Decommissioning 
Repsol Sinopec were granted a Cessation of Production authorisation by the UK Oil and Gas Authority in August 2020. Repsol Sinopec have submitted decommissioning plans to the Oil and Gas Authority, and are undertaking decommissioning of the Tartan installation and its associated infrastructure.

References 

North Sea oil fields
North Sea
Oil fields of Scotland
Oil fields of the United Kingdom